Commerce is a former village in southern Alberta, Canada within Lethbridge County. It was located within township 9, range 22, west of the fourth meridian, northwest of the City of Lethbridge between the Village of Nobleford and the Town of Picture Butte. It was known as the Village of Coalgate from 1912 to 1913.

History 
The community was founded in 1912 as a residential area for the Chinook coal mine northwest of Lethbridge. It was incorporated as the Village of Coalgate on July 9, 1912. The village was renamed to Commerce on December 17, 1913 to reflect the name of its post office. Its population in 1913 was 294.

The Chinook coal mine closed on January 25, 1924, and its population declined to an estimated 100 in 1924 and an estimated 50 in 1925. The village subsequently dissolved on May 13, 1926.

Demographics 

In the 1921 Census, Commerce had a population of 360.

See also 
List of communities in Alberta
List of former urban municipalities in Alberta
List of ghost towns in Alberta

References 

Former villages in Alberta
Ghost towns in Alberta
Localities in Lethbridge County